The Duke of Spoleto was the ruler of Spoleto and most of central Italy outside the Papal States during the Early and High Middle Ages (c. 500 – 1300). The first dukes were appointed by the Lombard king, but they were independent in practice. The Carolingian conquerors of the Lombards continued to appoint dukes, as did their successors the Holy Roman Emperors. In the 12th century, the dukes of Spoleto were the most important imperial vassals in Italy.

They usually bore the title dux et marchio, "duke and margrave" as rulers of both Spoleto and Camerino.

List of dukes

Lombard supremacy
 Faroald I 570–592
 Ariulf 592–602
 Theodelap 602–650
 Atto 650–663
 Transamund I 663–703
 Faroald II 703–724
 Transamund II 724–739, first time
 Hilderic 739–740
 Transamund II 740–742, second time
 Agiprand 742–744
 Transamund II 744–745, third time
 Lupus 745–752
 Unnolf 752
 Aistulf 752–756
 Ratchis 756–757
 Alboin 757–759
 Desiderius 758–759
 Gisulf 758–763
 Theodicius 763–773
 Hildeprand 774–788

Frankish supremacy

(ND - Non-dynastic; S - Supponids; W - Widonids)

 ND Winiges 789–822
 S Suppo I 822–824
 ND Adelard 824
 S Mauring 824
 S Adelchis I 824–834
 W Lambert of Nantes 834–836
 ND Berengar 836–841
 W Guy I 842–859
 W Lambert I 859–871
 S Suppo II 871–876
 W Lambert I 876–880
 W Guy II 880–883
 W Guy III 883–894
 W Lambert II 894–898
 W Guy IV 895–898

Feudal duchy
 Alberic I 898–922
 Boniface I 923–928
 Peter 924–928
 Theobald I 928–936
 Anscar 936–940
 Sarlione 940–943
 Hubert 943–946
 Boniface II 946–953
 Theobald II 953–959
 Transamund III 959–967 (period uncertain)
 Pandulf I 967–981
 Landulf 981–982
 Transamund III 982–989 (possibly Transamund IV)
 Hugh I the Great 989–996 (also Margrave of Tuscany)
 Conrad 996–998
 Adhemar 998–999
 Romanus 1003–1010
 Rainier 1010–1020
 Hugh II 1020–1035
 Hugh III 1036–1043

Tuscan supremacy
 Boniface III 1043–1052 (also Margrave of Tuscany)
 Frederick 1052–1055 (also Margrave of Tuscany)
Beatrice of Bar, 1052–1055 (regent as mother of Frederick and Mathilda)
Godfrey the Bearded, Duke of Lower Lorraine, 1053–1055 (regent as husband of Beatrice and step-father to Frederick and Matilda)
to the papacy 1056–1057
Matilda, 1057–1082 (also Margravine of Tuscany)
Godfrey the Bearded, Duke of Lower Lorraine 1057–1069 (also regent of Tuscany)
Godfrey the Hunchback, Duke of Lower Lorraine, 1069–1076 (also regent of Tuscany)
 Rainier II 1082–1086
 Matilda, 1086–1093 (also Margravine of Tuscany)
 Werner II 1093–1119
 Engelbert III of Sponheim, 1135–1137 (also Margrave of Tuscany)
 Henry the Proud, Duke of Bavaria, 1137–1139 (also Margrave of Tuscany)
 Ulrich of Attems, 1139–1152 (imperial vicar of Tuscany and Spoleto)
 Welf VI, 1152–1160 (also Margrave of Tuscany)
 Welf VII, 1160–1167 (also Margrave of Tuscany)
 Welf VI, 1167–1173 (also Margrave of Tuscany)
 Ridelulf 1173–1183
 Conrad I 1183–1190, first time
 Pandulf II 1190–1195
 Conrad I 1195–1198, second time

Papal supremacy
 Conrad II 1198–1205
 Henry 1205
 Diepold 1209–1225
 Rainald 1223–1230
 Conrad III 1227–1267
 Berthold 1251–1276
 Rainald 1251–1276
 Blasco Fernández assassinated 1367
 Guidantonio I da Montefeltro 1419–1443
 Pedro Luis de Borja 1456–1458
 Franceschetto Cybo c. 1503–1519

Member of Italian royal family
Prince Aimone Roberto Margherita Maria Giuseppe di Torino of Savoy (1904–1948)

See also
 List of Dukes and Princes of Benevento
 List of Princes of Salerno
 List of Princes of Capua

 
Lists of Italian nobility
Dukedoms of Italy
Lombards
Lists of dukes
Duchy of Spoleto